Sextus Julius Caesar was a Roman statesman, who held the consulship in 91 BC.  He died during the Social War.  He was the uncle of Gaius Julius Caesar, the dictator.

Family
Sextus was the son of Gaius Julius Caesar and Marcia.  Little is known of his father, except that he might have been the praetor Caesar who died suddenly at Rome. Wilhelm Drumann suspected that his grandfather was the senator Gaius Julius who wrote a history of Rome in Greek around 143 BC.  Sextus had a brother, Gaius, who was praetor in an uncertain year (Broughton suggests BC 92).  Gaius was probably the elder brother, as he was named after his father.  Following the cursus honorum, Sextus would have been at least forty years old when he obtained the consulship, placing his birth no later than 133 BC.

Of Sextus' descendants, we know that he had an eponymous son, who was Flamen Quirinalis in BC 57; the Sextus Julius Caesar who served in the Civil War, and was killed by his own soldiers during a revolt in Syria in 46 BC, was probably his grandson.

Career
Under the cursus honorum, Sextus would have held the praetorship before standing for consul.  His year of office is uncertain, but it could have been no later than BC 92 (Broughton suggests about 94).  He was elected consul for 91, the year before the outbreak of the Social War.  As proconsul the following year, Sextus won an important military victory, probably over the Paeligni.  He died of disease in 89, while laying siege to the city of Asculum.

Footnotes

See also
 Julia gens

References

Bibliography
 Titus Livius (Livy), Ab Urbe Condita (History of Rome).
 Gaius Plinius Secundus (Pliny the Elder), Naturalis Historia (Natural History).
 Appianus Alexandrinus (Appian), Bellum Civile (The Civil War), book i.
 Wilhelm Drumann, Geschichte Roms in seinem Übergang von der republikanischen zur monarchischen Verfassung, oder: Pompeius, Caesar, Cicero und ihre Zeitgenossen, Königsberg (1834–1844).
 Dictionary of Greek and Roman Biography and Mythology, William Smith, ed., Little, Brown and Company, Boston (1849).
 T. Robert S. Broughton, The Magistrates of the Roman Republic, American Philological Association (1952).

1st-century BC Roman consuls
Sextus (consul 663 AUC)
Roman aediles
Roman Republican praetors